The Port Moody Police Department is the police force for the City of Port Moody, British Columbia.

Controversy
On July 14, 2003, the PMPD came under the spotlight when a plainclothes officer shot and killed Keyvan Tabesh, an 18-year-old Iranian teen who had been driving around the city behaving erratically and wielding a machete in a threatening manner. After hearing radio transmissions that indicated Tabesh's vehicle was of interest after fleeing from a marked police unit, the officer came upon the vehicle turning on to a cul-de-sac. He used his unmarked police vehicle to block it in to prevent it from fleeing while he waited for marked police units for cover. Tabesh and one other occupant exited the vehicle. The officer identified himself as police and shouted for the men to not move. Rather than fleeing from him or dropping prone, both males ran towards the officer, Tabesh holding what the officer perceived to be a wood-handled weapon of an unknown type. The officer fired at the pair, killing Tabesh.

It was determined post-mortem that Tabesh had a blood alcohol content of .07, or "mild to moderate physical intoxication". At the coroner's inquest, it was found that Tabesh had major depression with psychotic features, and had been prescribed medication which he had stopped taking just prior to the incident. The five-person jury panel at the inquest found the act to be a homicide, meaning that it was caused by another person rather than natural causes or an accident, without the implication of criminal responsibility. The mayor and chair of the police board determined that a complaint against the officer for using excessive and lethal force when other options were available was not substantiated. This decision was further upheld by the Police Complaint Commissioner of British Columbia.

See also
 Combined Forces Special Enforcement Unit of British Columbia
 E-Comm, 9-1-1 call and dispatch centre for Southwestern BC

References

External links
 Port Moody Police Department

Law enforcement agencies of British Columbia
Port Moody